Hastula androyensis is a species of sea snail, a marine gastropod mollusk in the family Terebridae, commonly referred to as the auger snails.

Description
The length of the shell attains 12.8 mm.

Distribution
This marine species occurs off Madagascar.

References

 Bozzetti, L., 2008. Six new Terebridae (Gastropoda: Neogastropoda: Terebridae) from southern Madagascar. Malacologia Mostra Mondiale 60: 9–14

Terebridae
Gastropods described in 2008